Torben Bjerre-Poulsen (born 22 October 1949) is a Danish fencer. He competed in the team épée event at the 1972 Summer Olympics.

References

1949 births
Living people
Danish male fencers
Olympic fencers of Denmark
Fencers at the 1972 Summer Olympics
Sportspeople from Copenhagen